Peter Ingemann Moesgaard Sørensen (born September 7, 1967) is a Danish diplomat, EU Ambassador to the United Nations Office and other International Organisations in Geneva. He previously served as European Union Special Representative to Bosnia and Herzegovina.

Career
Sørensen obtained a BA degree (1991) and Master of Law degree (1993) from Aarhus University. He has been a lawyer in Denmark and Officer in the Danish Army. He is also 1 meter and 97 centimeters tall.

Sørensen was Senior Adviser to the Special Representative of the UN Secretary General/Head of UNMIK EU Pillar IV; Political Adviser to the United Nations Special Envoy for the Balkans; Head of Political Affairs in the OSCE Mission to Croatia; Legal Adviser in the Office of the High Representative in Bosnia and Herzegovina and he was part of the European Community Monitoring Mission in Sarajevo. From 2002 to 2006 Sørensen served as Deputy Head of UNMIK EU Pillar IV and Director of the European Office. From 2009 to 2011 he was the EU High Representative's Personal Representative in Belgrade.

Sørensen was appointed European Union Special Representative and Head of the EU Delegation to Bosnia and Herzegovina in September 2011 after previously having served as Head of the EU Delegation in Skopje, Macedonia.

In September 2014, Sørensen was appointed Head of the EU Delegation to the United Nations Office and other International Organisations in Geneva by the EU High Representative for Foreign Affairs and Security Policy.

References

External links
Peter Sørensen's CV on the Website of the EU Delegation to the UN in Geneva

Danish diplomats
Living people
Ambassadors of the European Union to Bosnia and Herzegovina
Ambassadors of the European Union to North Macedonia
1967 births
Danish officials of the European Union